Tordsvatnet is a lake in Skjåk Municipality in Innlandet county, Norway. The  lake lies within the Tafjordfjella mountain range inside the Reinheimen National Park. The lake lies in a low area surrounded by the mountains Benkehøa (to the east), Karitinden (to the northwest), and Vetldalseggi (to the west).

See also
List of lakes in Norway

References

Skjåk
Lakes of Innlandet